Zincite is the mineral form of zinc oxide (ZnO). Its crystal form is rare in nature; a notable exception to this is at the Franklin and Sterling Hill Mines in New Jersey, an area also famed for its many fluorescent minerals. It has a hexagonal crystal structure and a color that depends on the presence of impurities. The zincite found at the Franklin Furnace is red-colored, mostly due to iron and manganese dopants, and associated with willemite and franklinite.

Zincite crystals can be grown artificially, and synthetic zincite crystals are available as a by-product of zinc smelting. Synthetic crystals can be colorless or can range in color from dark red, orange, or yellow to light green.  

Both natural and synthetic zincite crystals are significant for their early use as semiconductor crystal detectors in the early development of crystal radios before the advent of vacuum tubes.  As an early radio detector it was used in conjunction with another mineral, galena, and this device was known as the cat's-whisker detector.

See also
 List of minerals
 Oleg Losev

References

External links
Mineral galleries

Oxide minerals
Zinc minerals
Hexagonal minerals
Minerals in space group 186
Zinc oxide